Sir George Anderson Critchett, 1st Baronet,  (18 December 1845 – 9 February 1925) was a British surgeon. He was Surgeon-Oculist to Edward VII from 1901 to 1910 and to George V from 1910 to 1918 and Surgeon-Oculist-in-Ordinary to George V from 1918 to 1925.

Critchett was knighted in 1901, appointed CVO in 1905, and promoted KCVO in 1919. He was created a Baronet, of Harley Street in the Borough of St Marylebone in 1908.

His brother was the actor and playwright R. C. Carton.

See also
 List of honorary medical staff at King Edward VII's Hospital for Officers
 Critchett baronets

References 

Knights Bachelor
1925 deaths
Baronets in the Baronetage of the United Kingdom
Knights Commander of the Royal Victorian Order
Fellows of the Royal College of Surgeons of Edinburgh
British surgeons
British ophthalmologists
People educated at Harrow School
Alumni of Gonville and Caius College, Cambridge